Khaled Melliti (born 22 May 1984) is a Tunisian football player, who plays as a midfielder for SC Ben Arous.

Career

Club career
Melliti participated in the 2007 FIFA Club World Cup with Étoile du Sahel and played 58 minutes in the Bronze Ball match against Urawa Red Diamonds. In the summer 2008, he signed with Club Africainfor 3 years, after an exchange agreement with Étoile du Sahel, who signed Ahmed Akeichi.

On 4 July 2011, Melliti joined French Ligue 2 club Istres on free transfer. Melliti then returned to Tunisia at the end of 2013, and played for CA Bizertin, CS Hammam-Lif, AS Gabès and Stade Gabèsien, before returning to his childhood club SC Ben Arous in January 2020.

Honours 
Étoile
Tunisian League : 2007
Leagues's Cup : 2005
CAF Champions League : 2007
CAF Confederation Cup : 2006
CAF Super Cup : 2007
Participation in FIFA Club World Cup : 2007

References

1984 births
Living people
Footballers from Tunis
Tunisian footballers
Tunisian expatriate footballers
Association football midfielders
SC Ben Arous players
Étoile Sportive du Sahel players
Club Africain players
FC Istres players
CA Bizertin players
CS Hammam-Lif players
AS Gabès players
Stade Gabèsien players
Ligue 2 players
Tunisian Ligue Professionnelle 1 players
Expatriate footballers in France
Tunisian expatriate sportspeople in France